Kongens Nytorv station (lit. King's New Square) is a Copenhagen Metro station located at Kongens Nytorv in downtown Copenhagen, Denmark. The station is located at the intersection of the M1/M2 and M3/M4 lines and is in fare zone 1. The station affords direct access to the Magasin du Nord department store.

History
Kongens Nytorv station opened as part of the initial segment of the Copenhagen Metro, with trains running west to Nørreport and east to either Vestamager or Lergravsparken. Construction for the City Circle Line, which is carry the M3 and M4 Lines and for which Kongens Nytorv is acting as an interchange, began on 4 October 2009 with wire work and archaeological sites. The excavation is expected to begin in mid-2011 and the station was opened on 29 September 2019.

Station layout

Kongens Nytorv is built and designed in the same style as other underground stations on the Copenhagen Metro. There are two main levels below ground level; the first is a few steps down from the street. At this level, passengers take an escalator down to a mezzanine switchback that makes them turn around and go down another escalator to reach platform level. There is also a lift that transports passengers to the platform. There are two entrances to the station as well: the southwestern corner of the intersection of Kongens Nytorv, Lille Kongensgade, Holmens Kanal, and Store Kongensgade and the other inside the Magasin du Nord department store.

Service

Both original Copenhagen Metro lines, the M1 and the M2, serve Kongens Nytorv. Both operate westbound towards Vanløse and eastbound towards Vestamager on the M1 and Lufthavnen on the M2. Since the City Circle Line and M4 were completed on 29 September 2019 and 28 March 2020, Kongens Nytorv has acted as a connection between the older metro lines and the M3 and M4 lines.

See also
 Kongens Nytorv

External links

Kongens Nytorv station on www.m.dk 
Kongens Nytorv station on www.m.dk 

City Circle Line (Copenhagen Metro) stations
M1 (Copenhagen Metro) stations
M2 (Copenhagen Metro) stations
M4 (Copenhagen Metro) stations
Railway stations opened in 2002
2002 establishments in Denmark
Railway stations in Denmark opened in the 21st century